The Southport Resolution is a set of triple-lock directives of the Liberal Democrats, a political party in the United Kingdom, which state the conventions that the leader of the party should follow if they choose to enter into a national political coalition with another party.

Background

After the general election in the UK in 1992, when the Liberal Democrats, then led by Paddy Ashdown, lost two seats in the UK Parliament, Ashdown became a notable proponent of co-operation between the Liberal Democrats and "New Labour". Ashdown had regular secret meetings with Tony Blair to discuss the possibility of a coalition government.

In 1997, after the election of the New Labour government led by Blair, he and Ashdown created a Joint Cabinet Committee (JCC) comprising senior Labour and Liberal Democrat politicians to discuss the implementation of the two parties' shared priorities for constitutional reform. Ashdown' wrote later in his autobiography that the remit of the JCC was later expanded to include other issues on which Blair and Ashdown saw scope for co-operation between the two parties. Later commentary suggests that during this period Ashdown lost touch with his party and that his pursuit of this common agenda ultimately led to his resignation.

Blair and Ashdown also agreed to create the Jenkins Commission to conduct a public inquiry into the case for electoral reform. Chaired by the Liberal Democrat peer Roy Jenkins, the commission recommended replacing the first-past-the-post electoral system with a system of proportional representation for use in general elections, in line with a key demand of Ashdown and his party. However, Blair remained unconvinced of the case for electoral reform, and the commission's recommendations have never been passed into law. The plan to bring Liberal Democrats into the government continued, according to Ashdown's published diaries, but foundered on opposition from senior Labour ministers,said by Ashdown to have been led by then Chancellor, and later Labour Party leader and Prime Minister, Gordon Brown.

As a result members of the Liberal Democrats at their Spring convention in Southport in March 1998 passed a resolution that "triple-locked" the party leader, requiring him or her to engage with both the parliamentary and federal Liberal Democrats before a formal coalition could be agreed.

Ashdown resigned as Liberal Democrat leader in early 1999. His successor, Charles Kennedy, allowed the JCC to slip into abeyance until it stopped meeting.

Southport Rules
The resolution passed states that:

In order for the proposal to pass the leader must gain:
 a 75 per cent majority of the Liberal Democratic Parliamentary Party (both MPs and members of the House of Lords) and
 a 75 per cent majority of the 30 elected members of the Federal Party Executive.

If both steps were not achieved, then the leader would call a special conference at which the resolution would need a two-thirds majority to pass.

If that was not achieved, then there could be a postal ballot of the whole party in which the resolution would again need  a two-thirds majority to pass.

2010 UK General Election
In the run up to the 2010 UK General Election, the Southport Rules came further media investigation, as the likelihood of a hung parliament rose.

Following a featured report on the rules by Michael Crick on BBC Newsnight on 12 March 2010, the Liberal Democrat Home Affairs spokesman Chris Huhne confirmed in interview that the then-leader, Nick Clegg, would be tied by the Southport Rules if there was a hung Parliament after the election.

See also
 Lib-Lab pact

References

Organisation of the Liberal Democrats (UK)